John David Abramson is an American physician and the author of the book Overdosed America: The Broken Promise of American Medicine. He has worked as a family doctor in Appalachia and in Hamilton, Massachusetts, and has served as chairman of the department of family practice at Lahey Clinic. He was a Robert Wood Johnson Fellow and is on the clinical faculty of Harvard Medical School, where he teaches primary care and public health policy.

He graduated from Harvard College. In 1974, he received a BMS from Dartmouth Medical School followed by his MD from Brown Medical School.

Books 
Sickening: How Big Pharma Broke American Health Care and How We Can Repair It. Mariner Books, 2022
Overdosed America: The Broken Promise of American Medicine. Harper, 2004

References

External links 
Interview of John Abramson on Breaking Points (video, 23 mins)

American primary care physicians
Harvard Medical School faculty
Living people
Year of birth missing (living people)
Harvard College alumni
Geisel School of Medicine alumni
Alpert Medical School alumni